Pikiao was a Maori rangatira (chieftain) of the Te Arawa tribal confederation based at Lake Rotorua in the Bay of Plenty, New Zealand, who was the ancestor of Ngāti Pikiao in Te Arawa, of Ngāti Mahuta in the Tainui confederation, and of Ngāti Pāoa in the Marutūāhu confederation. He probably lived in the early seventeenth century.

Life
Pikiao was the son of Kawatapu-a-rangi and, through him, a descendant of Tama-te-kapua, the captain of the Arawa canoe.

At Rotorua, he married Rakeiti and had a number of daughters, leading his father to despair of having male-line descendants. Though Rakeiti swore that a male child would come, Pikiao chose instead to leave her and travel down the Waikato River to the Waipā River, from which he went on foot to Mount Pirongia, where he met and married Rerei-ao, a descendant of the brothers Whatihua and Tūrongo and through them of Hoturoa, captain of the Tainui canoe. The link thus created between Tainui and Te Arawa is highly valued in Tainui whakapapa.

Pikiaio and Rakeiti had one son, Hekemaru, who married Heke-i-te-rangi and had three children:
Mahuta from whom Ngāti Mahuta of the Taupiri region in the Waikato are descended.
Pāoa from whom Ngāti Pāoa of the Hauraki Gulf are descended.
 Pare-tahuri, mother of Takupu-o-te-rangi, and grand-mother of Kiri-ngaua, the wife of her grand-uncle Mahuta.
Subsequently, Pikiao returned to Rakeiti in Rotorua and had another son, as Rakeiti had predicted:
Tamakari, from whom Ngāti Pikiao descend.

In his old age, he returned to Pirongia to live with Hekemaru and died there.

Sources
D. M. Stafford records the Te Arawa traditional account of Pikiao. Pei Te Hurinui Jones reports a similar account of the begatting of Hekemaru, which he heard from many Tainui elders.

References

Bibliography

Ngāti Pikiao people
Ngāti Mahuta people
Ngāti Pāoa people
New Zealand Māori men
17th-century New Zealand people